is the 16th studio album by Japanese singer/songwriter Yōko Oginome. Released through Victor Entertainment on December 17, 1997, the album was produced by Shinichi Osawa of Mondo Grosso, Monday Michiru, Hajime Yoshizawa of Cosmic Village, and Tosh Masuda. It features the singles "Look Up to the Sky", "From My Garden" and a Japanese-language cover of Alison Limerick's "Make It On My Own". It was Oginome's last studio release before her marriage to tennis player Ryuso Tsujino in 2001. The album was reissued on May 26, 2010, with three bonus tracks as part of Oginome's 25th anniversary celebration.

Track listing

References

External links
 
 
  

1997 albums
Yōko Oginome albums
Japanese-language albums
Victor Entertainment albums